William Kilgour "Willie" Jackson (14 March 1871 in Lamington, South Lanarkshire – 26 January 1955 in Symington) was a Scottish curler. He was the skip of the Royal Caledonian Curling Club team which won the first Olympic Gold medal in curling at the inaugural Winter Olympics in Chamonix, France, in 1924.

Jackson ran his family's farm in Symington. He was one of the top skips in Scotland at the time. He served as vice president of the Royal Club in 1922–23 and 1931–32 and served as president from 1933–34.

He was the father of fellow gold-medallist Laurence Jackson.

See also
 Curling at the 1924 Winter Olympics

References

External links
 

1871 births
1955 deaths
Sportspeople from South Lanarkshire
Scottish male curlers
British male curlers
Olympic curlers of Great Britain
Olympic gold medallists for Great Britain
Olympic medalists in curling
Curlers at the 1924 Winter Olympics
Medalists at the 1924 Winter Olympics
Scottish Olympic medallists